Harold Weber (March 20, 1882 – November 7, 1933) was an American golfer who competed in the 1904 Summer Olympics. He was from Littleton, New Hampshire.

In 1904 he was part of the American team which won the bronze medal. He finished 22nd in this competition. In the individual competition he finished 16th in the qualification and was eliminated in the first round of the match play.

He designed Highland Meadows Golf Course in Sylvania, Ohio in 1925. The course is the site of the LPGA Jamie Farr Owens Corning Classic.

Major championships

Results timeline
Note: Scott played in only the U.S. Amateur and the British Amateur.

LA = Low Amateur
NT = No tournament
DNP = Did not play
"T" indicates a tie for a place
DNQ = Did not qualify for match play portion
R256, R128, R64, R32, R16, QF, SF = Round in which player lost in match play
Yellow background for top-10

Source for 1913 British Amateur:  The American Golfer, July, 1913, pg. 225.

Source for 1914 British Amateur:  Golf Illustrated, July, 1914, pg. 28.

References

External links
 Profile

American male golfers
Amateur golfers
Golfers at the 1904 Summer Olympics
Olympic bronze medalists for the United States in golf
Medalists at the 1904 Summer Olympics
Golfers from New Hampshire
1882 births
1933 deaths